What a Night may refer to:

Film
 What a Night! (1928 film), an American silent film starring Bebe Daniels
 What a Night! (1931 film), a British comedy crime film directed by Monty Banks

Music
 What a Night (Tom Jones album), 1977, or the title song
 What a Night! A Christmas Album, a 2008 album by Harry Connick, Jr., or the title song
 "What a Night" (Kat DeLuna song), 2016
 "What a Night" (Loveable Rogues song), 2013
 "What a Night", 1978 song by City Boy 
 "What a Night", 1987 song by Dolly Dots
 "What a Night", 2022 song by Flo Rida
 "What a Night", 1961 song by Johnny Chester
 "December, 1963 (Oh, What a Night)", by the Four Seasons

See also 
 Oh, What a Night (disambiguation)